Phalonidia lydiae is a species of moth of the family Tortricidae. It is found in China (Anhui, Beijing, Gansu, Guizhou, Heilongjiang, Hunan, Jilin, Liaoning, Ningxia, Yunnan), Japan, Korea and Russia.

The wingspan is 9−13 mm.

References

Moths described in 1940
Phalonidia